Cuspidaria is a genus of plants in the family Bignoniaceae.

References

External links
 
 
 Cuspidaria at Tropicos

Bignoniaceae
Bignoniaceae genera